Virta (also written as Wirta) is a surname originating in Finland (in Finnish, it means "river" or "stream"). Notable people with the surname include:

 Hannu Virta (born 1963), Finnish ice hockey player
 Nikolai Virta (1906–1976), Russian writer, Stalin Prize winner
 Olavi Virta (1915–1972), Finnish singer, "king of Finnish tango"
 Patrik Virta (born 1996), Finnish ice hockey player
 Sofia Virta, Finnish politician
 Tony Virta (born 1972), Finnish ice hockey player

Finnish-language surnames